Keely Froling (born 31 January 1996) is an Australian professional basketball player for the Launceston Tornadoes in the NBL1.

Career

College
Froling played college basketball for two years at Southern Methodist University in Dallas, Texas for the SMU Mustangs. Froling decided to return home after her Sophomore season, to complete her studies and pursue her career in Australia.

WNBL
Born and raised in Townsville, Froling would begin her WNBL career in her home town, signed as a development player alongside her twin sister, with the Townsville Fire for the 2011–12 WNBL season. Froling remained a member of the Fire's roster through to 2014. She then departed to begin her college career in the United States. Froling cut her college career short and has returned to Australia, after she was signed by the Canberra Capitals for 2016–17.

National Team
Froling first played for Australia at the 2011 FIBA Oceania Under-16 Championship for Women where she took home Gold. She would then go on to participate in the world championship in Amsterdam, Netherlands where Australia placed 5th.

Personal life
Froling has a twin sister, Alicia who is also a professional basketball player. She played alongside her in Townsville, SMU and the U17 National team. Their younger brothers, Harry and Sam, have also represented Australia internationally.

References

1996 births
Living people
Australian expatriate basketball people in the United States
Australian women's basketball players
Canberra Capitals players
Forwards (basketball)
Sportspeople from Townsville
Townsville Fire players
Universiade medalists in basketball
Universiade gold medalists for Australia
Medalists at the 2017 Summer Universiade
Medalists at the 2019 Summer Universiade